Cedar Cliff High School is located in Camp Hill, Cumberland County, Pennsylvania, United States, and is older of the two high schools in the West Shore School District. It was formed in 1959 with the merger of West Shore High School and New Cumberland High School. The entire West Shore School District attended Cedar Cliff until fall 1965, when Red Land High School opened. In 2019, the school had 1,290 students enrolled. In 2011, the school had 95 teachers yielding a student teach ratio of 14:1. According to a 2011 report by the Pennsylvania Department of Education, eight teachers are considered "Non‐Highly Qualified" under No Child Left Behind law. The Cedar Cliff mascot is The Colt, and the school colors are navy blue, silver and gold. The Pennsylvania Department of Education has set the tuition for non-resident and charter school students at $8,969.40.

History 
Cedar Cliff High school was formed from the merger of West Shore High School (Closed Lemoyne Middle School) and New Cumberland High School (New Cumberland Middle School) in 1959. West Shore's colors, navy blue and silver, would merge with New Cumberland's navy blue and gold, to make Cedar Cliff's colors, navy blue, gold, and silver. The West Shore Joint School System would become the West Shore School District in 1966, the year that Red Land High School opened.

Dedication 
Cedar Cliff High School's dedication was held on October 25, 1959. Cedar Cliff was operated by the West Shore Joint Senior High School Board. This board was a jointure of the school districts of Lemoyne, Lower Allen Township, New Cumberland, Redland, and Wormleysburg. The board presented Cedar Cliff Senior High School as the "Fulfillment of a dream for better educational opportunities for the youth of its service area." Cedar Cliff opened with administrators Supervising Principal Raymond A. Wort, assistant John A. Johnson, and assistant Louis S. Edwards along with 60 faculty members.

Demographics 
The demographic breakdown of the 1,290 students enrolled for 2019-2020 was:

 Male - 687 (57%)
 Female - 603 (47%)
 Native American/Alaskan - 0
 Asian - 23 (2%)
 Black - 79 (6%)
 Hispanic - 183 (14%)
 White - 930 (72%)
 Multiracial - 66 (5%)

326 students were eligible for free lunch and 57 for reduced-cost lunch. For 2019-2020, Cedar Cliff was a Title I school.

Note: Details may not add to totals.

Notable alumni

 Kyle Brady – former tight end for the New York Jets, Jacksonville Jaguars, and New England Patriots, class of 1990
 Patrick Fabian - American actor of film, stage and television, including Better Call Saul, class of 1983
 Edson Hendricks - an IBM computer scientist and developer of RSCS or VNET, class of 1963
 Mike Regan – former U.S. Marshal and current Pennsylvania State Senator, class of 1980
 Rikki Rockett – drummer of rock band Poison, class of 1980
 Coy Wire – former linebacker for the Atlanta Falcons and Buffalo Bills, class of 1997
 Michele Smith (actress) - former host of American Thunder, class of 1980

References

External links
Cedar Cliff High School website

Camp Hill, Pennsylvania
High schools in Central Pennsylvania
Educational institutions established in 1959
Schools in Cumberland County, Pennsylvania
Public high schools in Pennsylvania
1959 establishments in Pennsylvania